Deuteronomium may refer to:
Deuteronomy, the fifth book of the Hebrew Bible
Deuteronomium (band), a Christian death metal band
Deuteronomium - Der Tag des jüngsten Gerichts, a 2004 Swiss horror film

See also
Deuteronomy (disambiguation)